"When I Paint My Masterpiece" is a 1971 song written by Bob Dylan. It was first released by The Band, who recorded the song for their album Cahoots, released on September 15, 1971.

Background 
Dylan himself first recorded the song at New York's Blue Rock Studio when he was backed by Leon Russell and session musicians, including Jesse Ed Davis on lead guitar. The recording sessions lasted from March 16 to 19, 1971, and also saw the recording of the 45 RPM single "Watching the River Flow", released by CBS Records on June 3, 1971. Both songs appeared on Bob Dylan's Greatest Hits Vol. II, released November 17, 1971, with Russell credited as the producer of the two songs.

During the March 1971 sessions at Blue Rock Studio, Dylan also recorded a solo version with slightly different lyrics, accompanying himself on piano. This version was released in 2013 on The Bootleg Series Vol. 10: Another Self Portrait (1969–1971).

Dylan and The Band performed the song together live, in the early hours of January 1, 1972, at a New Year's Eve concert by The Band; a recording was released as a bonus track on the 2001 CD reissue of The Band's live album Rock of Ages.

Reception and legacy
Douglas Brinkley, while interviewing Dylan for the New York Times in 2020, noted that "When I Paint My Masterpiece" was a song that had grown on him over the years and asked Dylan why he had brought it "back to the forefront of recent concerts". Dylan replied, "It’s grown on me as well. I think this song has something to do with the classical world, something that’s out of reach. Someplace you’d like to be beyond your experience. Something that is so supreme and first rate that you could never come back down from the mountain. That you’ve achieved the unthinkable. That’s what the song tries to say, and you’d have to put it in that context. In saying that though, even if you do paint your masterpiece, what will you do then? Well, obviously you have to paint another masterpiece". 

Los Lobos' Steve Berlin cited it as his favorite Dylan song in a 2021 Stereogum article, writing, "I love the way he creates such a vivid world in a three-minute song, and as a former constant traveler myself he captures the often delightful feeling of disconnection in a new unfamiliar place, and then the line about the land of Coca-Cola brings it all back home".

In popular culture

Dylan performs the song live (as a duet with Bob Neuwirth) during the opening credits of his 1978 film Renaldo and Clara. Dylan also performed a version of the song, with substantially re-written lyrics, to open his 2021 concert film Shadow Kingdom: The Early Songs of Bob Dylan.

For the closing credits of the 2013 documentary film Tim's Vermeer, Dylan sings an alternate take of the song.

Live performances
According to his official website, Dylan played the song live 182 times between 1975 and 2019. Five live performances of the song from Dylan's 1975 Rolling Thunder Revue tour were released on the box set The Rolling Thunder Revue: The 1975 Live Recordings in 2019. The live debut occurred at the War Memorial Auditorium in Plymouth, Massachusetts on October 30, 1975 and the most recent performances occurred on the Rough and Rowdy Ways World Wide Tour in 2021.

Notable covers
"When I Paint My Masterpiece" was frequently performed by the Grateful Dead in concerts starting in 1987; the song was sometimes played alongside several other Dylan songs. Though Grateful Dead vocalist Bob Weir sang lead on the song when it was played by the band, lead singer Jerry Garcia had played the song as early as 1972 with Merl Saunders and John Kahn, both of whom would become members of the Jerry Garcia Band.

The Band (without Robbie Robertson) performed the song at a 1992 Bob Dylan tribute concert. The recording was released on the CD of the event.

Chris Whitley recorded a blues version of the song for his last album, Dislocation Blues, which was released with Jeff Lang in 2005.

Elliott Brood performed "When I Paint My Masterpiece" on CBC Radio 2's Up Close program, and include it in some of their concerts.

The bluegrass band Greensky Bluegrass included a live version of the song on their 2010 live album All Access: Volume 1 recorded at The Riviera Theatre in Three Rivers, MI on Nov. 27, 2009. The song has a regular rotation in their live performances.

Blake Mills performed a live solo version of "When I Paint My Masterpiece" on Dylan's iconic Stratocaster guitar to celebrate the 50th anniversary of Dylan's performance at the 1965 Newport Folk Festival.

Personnel for studio recording released on Cahoots by The Band 
 Levon Helm - lead vocals, mandolin
 Robbie Robertson - acoustic guitar
 Garth Hudson - accordion
 Rick Danko - bass
 Richard Manuel - drums

Personnel for Bob Dylan studio recording, March 1971 
 Bob Dylan - vocal, guitar & harmonica
 Leon Russell - piano
 Jesse Ed Davis - guitar
 Don Preston - guitar
 Carl Radle - bass
 Jim Keltner - drums
 Claudia Lennear & Kathi McDonald - backing vocals

References

External links
Lyrics at Bob Dylan's official site

1971 songs
The Band songs
Bob Dylan songs
Grateful Dead songs
Songs written by Bob Dylan